Vizio Inc. (stylized as VIZIO) is an American publicly traded company that designs and sells televisions, sound bars, viewer data, and advertising. The company was founded in 2002 and is based in Irvine, California.

History
The company was founded in 2002 as V Inc. by entrepreneur William Wang and two founding employees. By 2004, Wang changed the company name to Vizio.

In 2006, the company's revenue was estimated at $700 million, and in 2007 it was estimated to have exceeded $2 billion. Vizio is known for selling its HDTVs at lower prices than its competitors.

On October 19, 2010, Vizio signed a 4-year contract to sponsor U.S. college football's annual Rose Bowl game in Pasadena, California, beginning with the 2011 Rose Bowl and ending with the 2014 Vizio BCS National Championship Game. When the Rose Bowl contract ended, Vizio signed a contract to sponsor the Fiesta Bowl making the official name the Vizio Fiesta Bowl.

In late 2014, Vizio acquired Advanced Media Research Group, Inc., the parent of entertainment website BuddyTV.

On July 24, 2015, Vizio filed with U.S. regulators to raise up to $172.5 million in an initial public offering of Class A common stock; however, the IPO was never completed.

In August 2015, Vizio acquired Cognitive Media Networks, Inc, a provider of automatic content recognition (ACR). Cognitive Media Networks was subsequently renamed Inscape Data. Inscape functioned as an independent entity until the end of 2020, when it was combined with Vizio Ads and SmartCast; the three divisions combining to operate as a single unit.

In November 2015, the U.S. Federal Trade Commission (FTC) and Office of the New Jersey Attorney General brought charges against Vizio, alleging it collected non-personal information on its customers and sold it to advertisers. In February 2017, Vizio agreed to pay $2.2 million to settle the charges. Additionally, the settlement required Vizio to delete the data it had captured and update its data collection practices. After the settlement, the company only collected data from TV units that opted in through disclosures.

On July 26, 2016, Chinese electronics company LeEco announced that it would acquire Vizio for US$2 billion; however, the acquisition was cancelled in April 2017.

From the year 2016 onwards, Vizio launched its SmartCast across all television sets including apps such as Netflix, YouTube and Disney+.

In 2018, Vizio launched a free streaming service called WatchFree, powered by Pluto TV, on its SmartCast platform.

As of 2021, Vizio had 527 employees across the U.S. in states including California, South Dakota, Washington, Arkansas, Minnesota, Texas, and New York. The company reported total revenue of $2.04 billion and net income of $102.5 million by the end of 2020.

 Vizio was the second largest seller of flat-screen televisions in the US. , the company has sold over 11 million sound bars and 80 million TVs, and has more than 12 million active SmartCast accounts.

In March 2021, Vizio filed for an IPO. In the same month, Vizio was listed on the New York Stock Exchange under the symbol VZIO.

In October 2021, Vizio was sued by the Software Freedom Conservancy for GPL violations.

Products
Vizio produces television sets and soundbars and has previously produced tablets, mobile phones and computers. Vizio manufactures its products in Mexico, China, and Vietnam under agreements with ODM assemblers in those countries.

Television sets
Television sets are Vizio's primary product category, and in 2007 the company became the largest LCD TV seller (by volume) in North America. In February 2009, Vizio announced they would stop production of plasma televisions and would focus on the LED-backlit LCD displays .

In March 2016, Vizio announced the release of SmartCast TVs that allowed users to control the screen from a tablet or mobile app. The following year, Vizio relaunched its smart TV platform to include apps directly on the screen, including Amazon Prime Video and Netflix.
In 2018, Vizio released its first Quantum Dot LED 4K TV. Vizio has added functionality for Google Assistant and Alexa-enabled devices, Apple Airplay2, Apple HomeKit and gaming features for its SmartCast TVs.

Sound bars 
Vizio's sound bar products are named by series, including the V-Series, M-Series, and Elevate. Series names pair with suggested TV products.

In 2013, Vizio released the Home Theater Sound Bar, a surround sound home audio system." In 2018, the company released its first Dolby Atmos soundbars. In 2020, Vizio released the Elevate soundbar, the first Atmos soundbar with rotating speakers. At CES 2020, Vizio earned the CES innovation award product designation for the Elevate sound bar.

Vizio's audio collection includes entry and mid-level sound bars that include surround sound, as well as premium versions.

SmartCast

SmartCast is the operating system/platform that Vizio uses in all their smart TVs.  It uses both Chromecast and Apple AirPlay.  In June 2021 Vizio updated SmartCast with a Vizio voice feature. The platform allows access to a limited number of streaming apps like Apple TV+, Disney+, Hulu, Netflix and Prime Video.

Past products 
Vizio has previously produced other products in addition to televisions and soundbars. In 2011, Vizio introduced the Via Tablet and Via Phone, its first tablet and mobile phone products. The following year, Vizio began producing laptops, creating a lineup of PC computers that came in ultrabook and notebook models. Also in 2012, Vizio introduced several HD Android smartphones in Asian markets, including China, and began selling the "Vizio Co-Star," a Google TV digital media player. In 2013, the company released the Vizio Tablet PC, its first Windows 8 tablet. The company stopped producing tablets and computers in 2014.

Lawsuit 
On October 19, 2021, Software Freedom Conservancy filed a lawsuit against Vizio Inc. because the company failed to fulfill the requirements of the GNU General Public License by failing to provide the source code. Software Freedom Conservancy states in the lawsuit that Vizio is "not providing and technical information that copyleft licenses require, Vizio was not even informing its customers about copylefted software and the rights it gives them as consumers." On November 29, 2021, Vizio filed a request to remove the case into US federal court. On Friday, 13 May 2022, Federal District Judge Josephine Staton sided with Software Freedom Conservancy and granted a motion to send the lawsuit back to Superior Court,  to answer breach-of-contract claims.

References

External links
 Official website

American companies established in 2002
Electronics companies established in 2002
Audio equipment manufacturers of the United States
Companies based in Irvine, California
Consumer electronics brands
Display technology companies
Electronics companies of the United States
Loudspeaker manufacturers
Video equipment manufacturers
2002 establishments in California
Manufacturing companies based in Greater Los Angeles
Companies listed on the New York Stock Exchange
2021 initial public offerings